Brondesbury Park railway station is a National Rail station in Brondesbury Park in the London Borough of Brent on the North London line in Travelcard Zone 2 which is managed by London Overground. It is close to the Queen's Park area.

History

The line was absorbed by the London and North Western Railway in 1867, but it was not until 1 June 1908 that a station at Brondesbury Park was opened.

Service
Brondesbury Park currently has the following London Overground (North London Line) services, which is operated by Class 378 trainsets.

Off-peak:

8tph to Stratford
4tph to Richmond
4tph to Clapham Junction

The last westbound train terminates at Willesden Junction Low Level (the first of the day in the other direction also starts there).

Connections
London Buses route 206 serves the station.

References

External links

 Excel file displaying National Rail station usage information for 2005/06 

Railway stations in the London Borough of Brent
Former London and North Western Railway stations
Railway stations in Great Britain opened in 1908
Railway stations served by London Overground
1908 establishments in England